Sir Anthony Keith Rawlinson, KCB (5 March 1926 – 22 February 1986) was a British civil servant.

Born on 5 March 1926, Rawlinson studied at Christ Church, Oxford, before service in the Army from 1944 to 1947. He then entered HM Civil Service and spent many years in HM Treasury. From 1972 to 1975, he was the UK's executive director at the IMF and the economic minister at the British Embassy in the US. He was then appointed a Deputy Secretary in the Department of Industry; after serving briefly as Second Permanent Secretary there from 1976 to 1977, he moved to the Treasury, where he was Second Permanent Secretary (with responsibility for public expenditure) from 1977 to 1983.

Rawlinson was then briefly Permanent Secretary of the Department of Trade in 1983, before it was merged to form the Department of Trade and Industry, where he was jointly Permanent Secretary until 1985. There, he was responsible for competition policy and negotiating with the London Stock Exchange over regulations which ultimately abolished the distinction between the stockjobber and the stockbroker, a key part of the government's reforms of the City. He was then chairman of the Gaming Board for Great Britain until he died after a fall while climbing Mount Snowdon on 22 February 1986. An avid climber, he had been elected president of the Alpine Club shortly before his death.

References 

1926 births
1986 deaths
British civil servants
Knights Companion of the Order of the Bath